Lukas Hoffmann (born 1984) is a German slalom canoeist who competed at the international level from 2002 to 2010.

He won a silver medal in the C1 team event at the 2007 ICF Canoe Slalom World Championships in Foz do Iguaçu and a bronze medal in the same event at the 2008 European Championships in Kraków.

References

German male canoeists
Living people
1984 births
Medalists at the ICF Canoe Slalom World Championships